Cell most often refers to:
 Cell (biology), the functional basic unit of life

Cell may also refer to:

Arts, entertainment, and media

Fictional entities
 Cell (comics), a Marvel comic book character
 Cell (Dragon Ball), a character in the manga series Dragon Ball

Literature
 Cell (novel), a 2006 horror novel by Stephen King
 "Cells", poem, about a hungover soldier in gaol, by Rudyard Kipling
The Cell (play), an Australian play by Robert Wales

Music
 Cell (music), a small rhythmic and melodic design that can be isolated, or can make up one part of a thematic context
 Cell (American band)
 Cell (Japanese band)
 Cell (album), a 2004 album by Plastic Tree
 Cells, a 1998 album by Cex
 Cells, a 2012 album by Fake Blood
 "Cells", an art song composed by G. F. Cobb and named after the poem by Kipling
 "Cells", a song by Bloem de Ligny
 "Cells", a song by The Servant
The Cells, an American rock band
"The Cell" (song), a 2006 song by Jandek

Other arts, entertainment, and media
 The Cell (film), a 2000 psychological thriller film starring Jennifer Lopez
 Cell (film), a 2016 film based on the Stephen King novel
 Animation cel, a transparent sheet on which objects are drawn or painted for traditional, hand-drawn animation
 "The Cell" (The Vampire Diaries), an episode of the TV series The Vampire Diaries
 "The Cell" (The Walking Dead), a 2016 television episode of The Walking Dead
 The Cell (BBC Four), Adam Rutherford's 3-part documentary series that aired on BBC Four
 The Cell, the original title of the TV series Sleeper Cell

Groups of people
 Cell, a group of people in a cell group, a form of Christian church organization
 Cell, a unit of a clandestine cell system, a penetration-resistant form of a secret or outlawed organization
 Cellular organizational structure, such as in business management

Rooms
 Monastic cell, a small room, hut, or cave in which a religious recluse lives, alternatively the small precursor of a monastery with only a few monks or nuns 
 Prison cell, a room used to hold people in prisons

Science, mathematics, and technology

Computing and telecommunications
 Cell (EDA), a term used in an electronic circuit design schematics
 Cell (microprocessor), a microprocessor architecture developed by Sony, Toshiba, and IBM
 Cell, a unit in a database table or spreadsheet, formed by the intersection of a row and a column
 Cell, in wireless local area networking standards (including Wi-Fi), a wireless connection within a limited area, referred to as a cell or Basic Service Set
 Cell, a fixed-length data frame used in the Asynchronous Transfer Mode protocol
 Cellphone, a phone connected to a cellular network
 Cell (network), area of radio coverage in a cellular network
 Memory cell (computing), the basic unit of (volatile or non-volatile) computer memory

Mathematics
 Cell (geometry), a three-dimensional element, part of a higher-dimensional object
Cell, an element of an abstract cell complex
Cell, a basic unit of a cellular automaton
Cell, an element of a CW complex
Cell, a k-face of a simplicial complex

Other uses in science and technology
 Cell (journal), a scientific journal
 Electrochemical cell, a device used to convert chemical energy to electrical energy
 Fuel cell, a device used to convert chemical energy from a fuel like hydrogen to electricity
 Galvanic cell or voltaic cell, a particular kind of electrochemical cell
 Photodetector, or photo cell, a sensor which detects light
 Solar cell, a component of photovoltaic systems used to convert the energy of light into electricity
 Storm cell, the smallest unit of a storm-producing system

See also
 CEL (disambiguation)
 Cellular (disambiguation)
 Macrocell